The  New York–Pennsylvania League season was the minor league baseball league's fourth season of play. The Scranton Miners finished the season with the best overall record, and were declared the league champions. The New York–Pennsylvania League played at the Class B level during this season.

Final standings

Stats

Batting leaders

Pitching leaders

New York-Pennsylvania League Season, 1926
Eastern League seasons